Hackelia floribunda is a species of flowering plant in the borage family known by the common names large-flowered stickseed and manyflower stickseed.

The plant is native to much of the western half of North America, in Canada and the Midwestern and Western United States.

It is most often found in areas which are wet during the springtime, such as meadows, wetlands, and riparian areas.

They emerge as a leafy clump, surrounded by many smooth lance-shaped leaves up to 24 meters long.

There are few leaves at the ends of the stems, which hold cyme inflorescences of blue flowers. Each flower has five lobes with petallike appendages at their bases.

The fruit is a tiny, mildly prickly nutlet.

References

External links
Calflora Database: Hackelia floribunda (Manyflower stickseed)
Jepson Manual eFlora (TJM2) treatment of Hackelia floribunda
UC CalPhotos gallery

floribunda
Flora of Canada
Flora of the Western United States
Flora of the United States
Flora of the South-Central United States
Flora of California
Flora of the Great Basin
Flora of the Rocky Mountains
Flora of the Sierra Nevada (United States)
Flora without expected TNC conservation status